Aedia banian is a species of moth of the family Erebidae. It was described by Pierre Viette in 1965 and is found in south western Madagascar. Its type was provided from Ankazoabo in Atsimo-Andrefana.

This species has a wingspan of 30–37 mm. The forewings are greyish, marbled blackish.

See also
List of moths of Madagascar

References

Calpinae
Moths described in 1965
Moths of Madagascar